In mathematics, a smooth compact manifold M is called almost flat if for any  there is a Riemannian metric  on M such that  and 
 is -flat, i.e. for the sectional curvature of  we have .

Given n, there is a positive number  such that if an n-dimensional manifold admits an -flat metric with diameter  then it is almost flat. On the other hand, one can fix the bound of sectional curvature and get the diameter going to zero, so the almost-flat manifold is a special case of a collapsing manifold, which is collapsing along all directions.

According to the Gromov–Ruh theorem, M is almost flat if and only if it is infranil. In particular, it is a finite factor of a nilmanifold, which is the total space of a principal torus bundle over a principal torus bundle over a torus.

Notes

References
 Hermann Karcher. Report on M. Gromov's almost flat manifolds. Séminaire Bourbaki (1978/79), Exp. No. 526, pp. 21–35, Lecture Notes in Math., 770, Springer, Berlin, 1980.
 Peter Buser and Hermann Karcher. Gromov's almost flat manifolds. Astérisque, 81. Société Mathématique de France, Paris, 1981. 148 pp.
 Peter Buser and Hermann Karcher. The Bieberbach case in Gromov's almost flat manifold theorem. Global differential geometry and global analysis (Berlin, 1979), pp. 82–93, Lecture Notes in Math., 838, Springer, Berlin-New York, 1981.
.
.

Riemannian geometry
Manifolds